The Polk County History Center is located at 100 East Main Street, Bartow, Florida. The museum consists of exhibits presenting local and regional history, and is located in the historic Old Polk County Courthouse.

Notes

External links
 Polk County History Center (official website)

Bartow, Florida
History museums in Florida
Museums in Polk County, Florida
History of Polk County, Florida
1998 establishments in Florida
Museums established in 1998